Prey Veng may refer to:

Prey Veng Province, in Cambodia
Prey Veng (city), capital of the province
Prey Veng (National Assembly constituency)